The majority loser criterion is a criterion to evaluate single-winner voting systems. The criterion states that if a majority of voters prefers every other candidate over a given candidate, then that candidate must not win.

Either of the Condorcet loser criterion or the mutual majority criterion implies the majority loser criterion. However, the Condorcet criterion does not imply the majority loser criterion, since the minimax method satisfies the Condorcet but not the majority loser criterion. Also, the majority criterion is logically independent from the majority loser criterion, since the plurality rule satisfies the majority but not the majority loser criterion, and the anti-plurality rule satisfies the majority loser but not the majority criterion. There is no positional scoring rule which satisfies both the majority and the majority loser criterion, but several non-positional rules, including many Condorcet rules, do satisfy both criteria.

Methods that comply with this criterion include Schulze, ranked pairs, Kemeny–Young, Nanson, Baldwin, Coombs, Borda, Bucklin, instant-runoff voting, contingent voting, and anti-plurality voting.

Methods that do not comply with this criterion include plurality, minimax, Sri Lankan contingent voting, supplementary voting, approval voting , and score voting .

See also 
 Majority criterion
 Mutual majority criterion
 Voting system

References 

Electoral system criteria